Moon Fire Temple is a sacred garden temple located in the Santa Monica Mountains. Jimi Hendrix, Janis Joplin and The Doors performed at the Moon Fire Temple regularly during the late 1960s and early 1970s.

The temple was built for the 1966 Paul Newman film, Harper, and is featured prominently as The Temple in the Clouds.

Artists who have featured their work include, Andy Warhol, David Nelson Rose, Dokken, Bon Jovi in Walk Away, Mastodon, Thrill Kill Cult, and Tommy Chong in Far Out Man.

Movies and Magazines include:
 Harper (film)
 Babylon A.D.
 Maxim magazine
 Bebe magazine
 Italian Vogue magazine
 Vogue magazine
 Violet magazine
 High Times
 Amica magazine

References

External links 
 Los Angeles

Religious buildings and structures in Los Angeles County, California